Type 346 radar is a highly digitized, multi-function, dual-band (S and C bands) naval active electronically scanned array (AESA) installed on Type 052C destroyers, Type 052D destroyers, Type 055 destroyers and Type 002 aircraft carriers of the PLAN. The radar is named as the Star of the Sea (Hǎi-Zhī-Xīng, 海之星) by its developer and it is one of the two competitors for PLAN’s SAPARS (Shipborne Active Phased Array Radar System) project/program. Due to its secrecy and lack of information, Type 346 radar has been frequently but erroneously confused with a Chinese fire control radar Type 348, and mistakenly identified as Type 348 by many sources. Furthermore, it is also frequently confused with and misidentified as Sea Lion series C-band phased array radars developed by another design house.
Several models in the Type 346 series have been developed. When Star of the Sea was selected as the winner of SAPARS and accepted into Chinese service, it received the Chinese naval designation for the entire radar system as H/LJG-346 or Type 346 for short. The NATO reporting name for Type 346 radar is Dragon Eye.

Development history
The development of Type 346 radar is marred with fierce competition between the two contenders, the 14th Research Institute in Nanjing, also known as Nanjing Institute of Electronic Technology (南京电子技术研究所)  of China Electronics Technology Group (CETG), or 14th Institute for short, and the 23rd Research Institute of the 2nd Research Academy of CASIC, or 23rd Institute for short. When the program begun in the late 1980s in the era where military spending is drastically reduced, the program was extremely lucrative in that not only winner would be rewarded 210 million ¥ developmental fund, but another additional 20 million ¥ for infrastructure investment. As a result, the bid between the two had expanded beyond the normal technical competition, but ended up in political struggle that involved the top brass of the Chinese leadership, which caused years of delay and almost killed the program.

Initial phase
The eventual winner, the 14th Institute, was experienced in developing phased array radar, and the final radar equipped Chinese destroyers is based on experience gained in the two previous phased array radars. Near the end of Iran–Iraq War, both countries asked China to develop a large early warning phased array radar within two to three years respectively for each country. 14th Institute was assigned to complete the task, and mobilized all the available resources at the time to complete the program, with the general engineer of the 14th Institute Mr. Zhang Guang-Yi (张光义, the general designer of the first Chinese phased array ballistic missile early warning radar Type 7010) was assigned as the program manager. Ms. Wang Jun (王军) and Mr. Zhang Ya-Peng (张亚朋) were assigned as the general designer and the deputy general designer of the L-band Type 893. Meanwhile, Mr. Li Zhi-Ming (李治铭) and Mr. Diao Chen-Xi (刁晨曦) were assigned as the general designer and the deputy general designer of the P-band Type 894. However, as both designs were completed and production was just about to be commenced, orders for both radars were cancelled in 1989 due to the end of Iran-Iraq War. The cancellation of foreign orders did not spell the end of the program because domestic Chinese need had filled in the void. In November 1989, two 14th Institute staff, Mr. Sun Xian-Zhang (孙宪章), the general designer of Type 1461 phased array radar, and Mr. Cai Ben-Yao (蔡本耀) attended a conference on the radar for Type 052B destroyer in Sanya hosted by the Equipment Department of PLAN. Preliminary proposal by 14th Institute was to adopt a S-band APAR, which was approved. Due to age and illness, Mr. Sun Xian-Zhang retired after securing 14th Institute as a contender of the naval radar program, and others were assigned to take over, with Ms. Wang Jun as the general designer, and Mr. Diao Chen-Xi as the deputy general designer.

In the early summer of 1991, the then head of Equipment Department of PLAN, rear admiral He Pengfei (贺鹏飞, son of late Field Marshal He Long) met with the team of 14th Institute at 3rd Directorate of the People's Liberation Army General Staff Department in Beijing. Admiral He informed the team that the range of Chinese radars onboard PLAN ship was only several dozen kilometers while radar ranges of radars onboard Japanese and Taiwanese warships was two hundred to three hundred kilometers. In the event of war, PLAN ships would be sunk before they could detect enemy ships, so it would be imperative for Chinese radar developers to develop a phased array radar to boost the combat capability of PLAN. To meet this requirement of PLAN that would eventually become PLAN's SAPARS (Shipborne Active Phased Array Radar System) project/program, the 14th institute presented the development and research results since November 1989, and Mr. Zhang Guang-Yi informed PLAN that based on the size limitation of the radar antenna (4 meter × 4 meter) onboard Type 052B destroyer, a S-band APAR would have a range in excess of 300 km, 50% higher than the original PLAN requirement of 200 km.

The 14th Institute was not the first contender of APAR, instead, 23rd Institute was. The original PLAN requirement of the radar range was only two hundred kilometers, and this was based on the design provided by the 23rd Institute, which was a C-band APAR. When 14th Institute joined the bid, its research had revealed that a C-band APAR could not meet the two hundred kilometer range requirement. After two rounds of evaluation held at Fragrant Hills, PLAN favored the 14th Institute and asked the latter to provide a sample within three to five years. The then deputy director of the 14th Institute Mr. Bao Yang-Hao (包养浩) and the then deputy general engineer of the 14th Institute Mr. Hua Hai-Gen (华海根) reassigned the personnel in October 1991 to form the project team. In March 1992, the prototype of the S-band APAR was designated as Type 115. The original design adopted a layout similar to that of AN/APQ-53 radar of MIM-104 Patriot, with a main S-band array with a total of 3456 transceivers and a small C-band array to control HQ-9 SAM including such as TVM, ARH and SARH. The design was tentatively approved by PLAN for the initial two hundred kilometer range requirement, but after further discussion, the 14th Institute was tasked to upgrade the design to extend the maximum range to three hundred kilometers by the PLAN evaluation team headed by rear admiral Zhao Deng-Ping (赵登平), the son-in-law of late Senior General Chen Geng.

Design upgrade
The requirement for Type 115 radar was to operate with the elevation form 0° to 90°, scanning sector of ± 60° when the ship was rolling at ± 20°. The 14th Institute formed a team to complete the prototype with members including Wang Jun as the general designer, Diao Chen-Xi as the deputy general designer, Duan Qing-Ren (段庆仁) as the chief reliability engineer, Chen Hong-Yuan (陈洪元) as the chief structural engineer, Li Heng-Zhao (李亨昭) as the chief manufacture engineer, Chen Zhen-Cheng (陈振成) as the transceiver design engineer, and Chen Hong (陈红) as the general designer of the antenna feeders. Experts from 724th Institute, Nanjing University of Aeronautics and Astronautics, and Nanjing University of Science and Technology were invited to evaluate, and based on their input, design was modified accordingly. The resulting modification resulted in the increase of transceivers from the original 3456 per face to 4768 per face with increased range. In early June 1992, a team of 14th Institute went to Fragrant Hills for the third time to report the progress, and after two days of presentation, PLAN representatives at the conference informed the team on June 10, 1992 that they would recommend to their superior to select 14th Institute as the contractor of SAPARS. The following month, another team from the 14th Institute subsequently visited the 701st Institute, the design bureau of Type 052B destroyer, and met with the general designer of Type 052 destroyer (and later Type 052C destroyer) Mr. Yuan Du-Lei (袁敦垒, succeed Mr. Pan Jing-Fu [潘镜芙] as Mr. Pan retired) and the radar system engineer Ms. Xi Xiu-Juan (奚秀娟) to discuss system integration issues.

However, the competitor of 14th Institute, the 23rd Institute, accused the 14th Institute would not be able to produce the solid state transceivers in time to meet the PLAN requirement, and being the first of its kind developed in China, PLAN also worried about the potential failure, and informed 14th Institute to develop the solid state transceivers first, or else it would receive any funding for further development. Although the 14th Institute had previously successfully developed solid state L-band transceivers, the new S-band with shorter wavelength presented greater challenge in that the new transceiver must be more compact and more resistant to interference. The 14th Institute formed a project team to develop the new transceiver, with the following members: designer of the circulator is Zhang Fu-Qiong (张福琼), assisted by Mo Jia-Ming (莫家铭). Guo Yan-Ling (郭艳玲) was put in charge of structural, weight & ECM, assisted by Liang Heng-Xin (梁恒心) and Huang Xin-Fu (黄兴富). Niu Bao-Jun (牛宝君) was in charge of antenna, assisted by Sun Mao-You (孙茂友). Chen Zhen-Cheng as the transmitter module designer, and Yu Hong-Biao (于洪标) as the receiver module designer, assisted by Gu Zhong-Ru (顾仲汝). Ma Heng-Tai (马恒泰) as the phase shifting module designer, with Shi Mei-Ling (施美玲) handles the control portion. Ding You-Shi (丁友石) was put in charge of microelectronics. The design team begun its hectic workload/schedule in September 1992.

Due to the technological bottlenecks China faced in the early 1990s, it was impossible to provide the power source for every single transceiver of the APAR. Instead, the design team took an approach similar to that of British MESAR and Israeli EL/M-2075 APARs by group four transceivers into a transmitting/receiving (T/R) module with 100W peak power, and each T/R module was powered by its own power source. Each T/R module was sized twenty centimeter in width, five centimeter in thickness and forty-five centimeter in length. By April 1993, the team finally successfully developed the required T/R module, which eventually won 2nd place Science and Technology Advancement Award given by the Ministry of Electronic Industry of China in 1994.

Early evaluation & redesign
The successful development of T/R module would normally signal the progress to the next stage of the development, and the 14th Institute mistakenly believed that PLAN would grant the developmental funds for further development. However, this was not meant to be because politics came into play.  To fight for the huge developmental fund and the associated fund for infrastructure development, the other competitor of SAPARS, the 23rd Institute collected potential shortfalls of S-band radar and thru political maneuver, successfully obtained the support from then Chinese premier Li Peng, who was once the head aerospace ministry, the predecessor of CASIC and parent company of the 23rd Institute. Under the political pressure, another round of evaluation by 10 academicians of Chinese Academy of Science (CAS) were held in May 1994, and academicians included radars specialist Chen Yun-Fang (陈芳允), Mao Er-Ke (毛二可), Bao Zheng (保铮), Wang Xiao-Mo (王小谟), and Wang Yue (王越). Also included was destroyer designer Pan Jing-Fu (潘镜芙) and missile specialist Xu Chang-Lin (徐长林). The S-band APAR design with a maximum range of three hundred seventy-five kilometer range of the 14th Institute was clearly technically superior than the C-band APAR design of the 23rd Institute, which only has a maximum range of a hundred twenty kilometers, just approximately a third of range requirement while the S-band APAR design exceeded the original three hundred kilometer range requirement by 25%. However, the academicians’ votes were not unanimous. Academician Bao Zheng, Wang Xiao-Mo, Xu Chang-Lin, Pan Jing-Fu favored the S-band design, but Academician Mao Er-Ke and Chen Yun-Fang favored the C-band design, because Aerospace Ministry ordered its employee Chen Yun-Fang to vote for the C-band design and promised a reward after his vote. Aerospace Ministry also helped Mao Er-Ke in obtaining his academician title and he voted for C-band design in return. Academician Wang Yue was the general designer of a competing design offered by 206th Institute competing against 14th Institutes earlier for Type 373 counter-battery radar, which the 14th Institute won with the design by the deputy general engineer of the 14th Institute Wang Dechun (王德纯) at the time so Wang Yue voted abstention.  Due to the voting outcome by academicians were not unanimous, the general designer of 052B/C destroyers Mr. Yuan Dun-Lei could not make the final decision, and PLAN once again delayed its decision to require further studies of both design.
 
In addition to the outcome of first evaluation by CAS academicians, there was another hurdle: 23rd Institute, the developer of HHQ-9, changed the parameters and requirements of HHQ-9, so system integration of APAR and the SAM system would thus encountered additional obstacles. Two of the major changes are the weakening of HHQ-9 tracking signal and the tracking range of HHQ-9 respectively. For the signal tracking, the signal is greatly reduced ostensively to reduce the probability of being intercepted by enemy. For the tracking range increase, it was ostensively due to the range of HHQ-9 has been increased by several dozen kilometers, so tracking range must be increased accordingly. Though these two changes appeared to be legitimate, the changes were made after the parameters of HHQ-9 were already set when the bid first started, and the change of the original requirement were viewed by both the 14th Institute and PLAN evaluation team as a willfully generated obstacle to prevent 14th Institute from winning due to the political interference from the very top level of the Chinese government. Unreasonable as it was, 14th Institute was forced to once again revise its design to meet the new requirement that was more stringent. If not, its competitor 23rd Institute would have a chance to field its design. The proposal of the 23rd Institute appeared to be a compromise, with the S-band APAR of the 14th Institute as search and track radar, and its own C-band APAR for missile control. This twin radar concept of the 23rd Institute would increase the weight of the superstructure tremendously, a problem 23rd Institute recommended to be left for the general designer of the destroyer to solve. Obviously this could not be achieved in the short frame of time, and in order to meet the original schedule of delivery PLAN desperately needed, decision was made to import Russian MR-710 Fregat (meaning frigatebird) radar (NATO reporting name: Top Plate) for installation onboard Type 052B destroyers first, and APAR would have to wait until later for Type 052C destroyers.

Knowing the twin-radar design was not feasible at all, the 14th Institute design team was determined to win. The original Star of the Sea design consisted of two active arrays: an octagon S-band array with diameter of four meters for search and track, and a much smaller C-band active array with diameter of 60 centimeters for missile control. With an area approximately 0.3 square meter, the small C-band array could not effectively control the HHQ-9 SAM with the increased range and reduced tracking signal. A larger C-band array was needed. The 14th Institute design team abolished the small C-band array, and adopted two larger 0.2 meter by four meter rectangular arrays, and in terms of area, each C-band array is more than two and half time of the original small array with diameter of 0.6 meter. The redesigned APAR fully met the latest requirement of HHQ-9. After two more rounds of discussion between PLAN and the two competitors held in March 1994 and August 1994 respectively, the redesigned Star of the Sea was finalized and submitted to Department of Equipment of PLAN in October 1994. However, there was no response for two months after the submittal because 23rd Institute was exerting political maneuvers through its mother company CASIC in an attempt to influence the then Chinese premier Li Peng to make its decision that would favor its C-band design. In response, the 14th Institute had to resort some political maneuver of its own for help by directly writing to Admiral Liu Huaqing and then Central Military Commission chairman Jiang Zemin, who was the former head of the Electronic Ministry, the predecessor of CETG.  Finally in April 1995, PLAN notified the 14th Institute by telephone that another round of evaluation would be conducted in the following month.

Final evaluation & further redesign
Another round of evaluation on SAPARS competitors lasted three days from May 4 thru May 6, 1995. This time, the CAS academicians selected were kept secret to prevent anyone from be bribed or politically pressure/influence. It was after this evaluation the 14th Institute was basically selected as the winner, with the exception of some additional technical details to be ironed out, which was successfully handled in the two subsequent conferences with PLAN held in August and October 1995 respectively.   On November 7, 1995, 14th Institute was declared as the winner of the SAPARS competition and radar was given the PLAN designation H/LJG-346 or Type 346 for short, along with the 280 million ¥ developmental fund, which was a third increase from the original 210 million ¥ originally planned. Due to the advancement in the Chinese microelectronics industry, the design of the T/R module was drastically improved, with the length of each module reduce from forty-five centimeter to forty centimeter, and with the utilization of newly developed material, the weight of each module was also greatly reduced. Based on this progress, Star of the Sea APAR went through yet another redesign in March 1996 by increasing transceivers in each face from 4768 to more than five thousands. As a result, the maximum range was increased a further seven percent to more than four hundred kilometers. Additional transceivers in each face of the antenna also meant more power, which helped to reduce the disproportionally high allocation of power (up to thirty percent) for SAM handling. The additional power would enable to further expand the multi-functionality of the radar.

As Type 346 development continued, 14th Institute team went another personnel change. Due to the urgent need of integrating Russian MR-710 radar to Type 052B destroyer, the original general designer Wan Jun was reassigned as the general engineer of this program, and later on, deputy general designer Diao Chen-Xi immigrated to Canada in July 1996. Zhou Wan-Xing (周万幸) was appointed as the new general designer of Type 346. Half a decade later, in late December 2001, sea trials for the pre-production unit begun in northern China. In April 2002, development suffered a setback in that the radar suddenly stopped working during a trial. After two days of simulation, the problem was identified and resolved.  In 2003, the 14th Institute development team spent half a year to resolve the sea clutter problem. In June 2004, final trials for certification begun and successfully concluded in the winter of the same year, with the APAR officially accepted into service one and half a decade later after it first begun. Chinese media only claims it took a decade to develop the APAR, starting in mid-1995 when the 14th Institute was finally selected as the official developer of the SAPARS,  but in reality, the program really begun in approximately half a decade earlier in November 1989 when both competitors begun to work on their own respective designs for the bid.

Design features
Being the first naval APAR developed in China for a prolonged period of fifteen years, the designs of the Star of the Sea radar have experienced several major revisions and the prototype differs significantly from the production version. The very first prototype of the series Type 115 layout similar to that of AN/APQ-53 radar of MIM-104 Patriot that includes two arrays: the main array is the four meter diameter octagon S-band array with a total of 3456 transceivers for searching and tracking, and a small 60 centimeters diameter C-band array with an approximate area of 0.3 square meter to control HHQ-9 SAM via TVM/SARH/ARH. The Space Target Surveillance Phased Array Demonstrator is a derivative of Type 115 with the C-band array deleted because it was intended for tracking objects in space after the enlargement for the planned production version. As the control requirement of HHQ-9 became more stringent, the design of Type 115 proved to be inadequate and the production versions adopted a different array layout instead.

The production version of Star of the Sea radar have a new S-band array with more than five thousand transceivers in each face, with increased range in excess of four hundred kilometers. This main S-band array is sandwiched between two rows of C-band arrays, each with size of 0.2 meter by four meter. The two C-band arrays are used to control HHQ-9 SAMs. The first production version of Star of the Sea is Type 346 on Type 052C destroyers and it utilizes air cooling system, which is replaced by liquid cooling system in its successor Type 346A onboard Type 052D destroyers. Type 346 inherits the design feature of the prototype of grouping four transceivers into a 100W peak power T/R module with its own power source.

The efficacy of the Type 346 as deployed on the Type 052D destroyer against contemporary tactical low-observable ("stealth") aircraft is uncertain. Stealth aircraft are optimized against higher-frequency radar bands (C, X, and Ku), but features like the tail-fin may be susceptible to lower S- or L-band frequencies. However, the large resolution cells of S- or L-band radar may not be able to generate missile guidance track at tactically significant distances; refining the resolution be networking multiple low-frequency radars may help address this.

Variants
Four variants of Type 346 series have been revealed (as of 2016):
Type 115: Prototype of Type 346 series with a large S-band array and a small C-band array in a layout similar to AN/APQ-53 radar of MIM-104 Patriot.
Space target surveillance phased array demonstrator: a small light weight technology demonstrator with 128 T/R modules for a planned large APAR with 30 meter diameter array intended as the successor of the retired Type 7010 ballistic early warning radar. This model lacks the C-band array for fire control because it is a searching/tracking-only radar. It is not clear if the program has progressed beyond the prototype stage.
Type 346: First naval version with a large S-band array sandwiched between two rows of C-band arrays, utilizing air cooling system and identifiable by the curved surface of the cover of the radar array. Installed onboard Type 052C destroyers.
Type 346A: Development of Type 346 with increased number of T/R module and increased range, utilizing liquid cooling system and identifiable by the flat surface of the cover of the radar array. Installed onboard Type 052D destroyer and Type 002 aircraft carrier.  
Type 346B: Development of Type 346A intended for larger warship. Installed onboard Type 055 destroyers.

Specification
For Type 346:
Total number of faces: 4
Bands: S and C
S-band array size & shape: octagon with 4 meter diameter
C-band array size & shape: ≈ 0.8 to 1 square meter rectangular ea.
Number of S-band arrays: 4 (1 per face)
Number of C-band arrays: 8 (2 per face)
Maximum search range (km): > 450
Weight (t): < 16 above deck
Scan: 120°
Elevation: 0° to 90°
Cooling: Air (Type 346), Liquid (Type 346A)

See also
Chinese radars
Naval Weaponry of the People's Liberation Army Navy
Phased array
Active electronically scanned array
Active phased array radar
AN/SPY-3
AN/SPY-6
OPS-24
Selex RAN-40L

References

Naval radars
Sea radars
Military radars of the People's Republic of China
Military equipment introduced in the 2000s